The Ewing Seamount is a seamount in the southern Atlantic Ocean, which lies on the Tropic of Capricorn. Ewing is part of the Walvis Ridge having a mean depth of 4,500 metres and a summit depth of 700 metres.

References

Seamounts of the Atlantic Ocean